"If (They Made Me a King)" is a popular song with music written by Tolchard Evans and the lyrics written by Robert Hargreaves and Stanley J. Damerell. The song was written in 1934, but the most popular versions were recorded in 1950-1951. Perry Como's version, recorded November 28, 1950, was a number-one hit on the Billboard charts for eight weeks. 
The Como version was released under the following labels and catalog numbers:
In the United States, by RCA Victor, as catalog number 47-3997 with the flip side "Zing Zing - Zoom Zoom"
In Argentina, by Discos RCA Victor Argentina, as catalog number 68-0583 with the flip side "Zing Zing - Zoom Zoom"
In the United Kingdom, by HMV, as catalog number B-10042 with the flip side "Zing Zing - Zoom Zoom"
In Germany, by HMV, as catalog number X-7293 with the flip side being a Tony Martin/Dinah Shore recording of "A Penny a Kiss"

Other charted versions in 1951
Jo Stafford also recorded the song (with "queen" for "king" in the lyric). Her version, with the Paul Weston orchestra backing her, was recorded on October 16, 1950 and released by Columbia Records as catalog number 39082. This reached No. 8 in the Billboard charts.
Billy Eckstine recorded the song December 21, 1950, and scored a #10 hit.
Dean Martin recorded the song December 2, 1950, and scored a #14 hit.
Guy Lombardo & His Royal Canadians (vocal by Bill Flanagan) - peaked at No. 20.
The Ink Spots - peaked at No. 23.
Jan Garber & His Orchestra (vocal by Roy Cordell) - peaked at No. 26.
Vic Damone - peaked at No. 28.

Other versions
Louis Armstrong - recorded February 6, 1951 for Decca Records (catalog No. 27481).
In 1961, doowop group "The Paragons" released a version which peaked at No. 82 and spent 5 weeks in the Top 100.
The Bachelors - Presenting: The Bachelors (1964).
Timi Yuro - this was another distaff version (substituting "queen" for "king") and included in her album The Amazing Timi Yuro (1964).
Jerry Vale - Jerry Vale's Greatest Hits (1961).
Al Hirt released a version of the song in 1969.  The song went to #16 on the Adult Contemporary chart and #116 on the Billboard Hot 100.

References

1934 songs
1950 singles
1969 singles
Songs written by Tolchard Evans
Number-one singles in the United States
Dean Martin songs
Perry Como songs
RCA Victor singles